Sadeq Kia (15 May 1920 – 1 March 2002) was an Iranian man of letters, distinguished professor of Iranian languages and the director of the second Academy of Persian Language and Literature.

Biography
 
Kia was born in Tehran, Iran, on 15 May 1920. Upon earning a doctorate in Persian from the University of Tehran in 1944, he was appointed associate professor and began teaching the Pahlavi language and literature. Kia presided over the second Language Academy from the year of its inception in 1970 until 1978. Following the Revolution of 1979 he was dismissed from all his positions and immigrated to the United States. Kia died in Missoula, Montana on 1 March 2002. In accordance with his will, his body was cremated and the ashes were released in the Caspian Sea.

Works 
Kia published dozens of monographs and articles on various subjects, including literature, lexicology, dialectology, folklore, and history. His expertise in Middle Persian led to the publication of several texts. His major scholarly contribution was in the field of lexicology. He collected and edited the Mazandarani language fragments from various historical sources and proposed tentative translations. Kia compiled a glossary for the Gorgani dialect used in the Hurufi scriptures. Kia's contribution to the history of the Hurufi and Nuqtavi denominations as well as the Caspian calendar are rated as essential. A selection of Kia's articles is accessible in the portal of the Institute for Humanities and Cultural Studies.

References

Academic staff of the University of Tehran
1920 births
2002 deaths
Iranian emigrants to the United States
University of Tehran alumni
People from Nur, Iran